John Marshall Bay (November 30, 1928 – November 7, 1982) was an American actor and playwright.

Personal
Bay was born in Chicago, the location of his family's company, Bays English Muffins.

He was married to the actress Elaine Stritch for nine years until his death from brain cancer in 1982.

Career
Bay appeared in many productions, including the Doctor Who story The Crusade in 1965, playing the fourth Earl of Leicester.  He also originated the role of Samovar in the original London production of A Day in Hollywood / A Night in the Ukraine. Bay also toured the United States in the early 1980s with his one-man play "An Elephant in My Pajamas," based on the life of Groucho Marx.

Partial filmography
Design for Loving (1962) - Freddie
Yellow Dog (1973) - Galloway
Gold (1974) - Syndicate Member
The Private Files of J. Edgar Hoover (1977) - Heywood Brown

References

External links

John Bay at Theatricalia

1928 births
1982 deaths
Deaths from brain cancer in the United States
Male actors from Chicago
20th-century American male actors